The Cham calendar (Cham: ꨧꨆꨥꨪ sakawi) is a lunisolar calendar used by the Cham people of Vietnam since ancient times. Its origins is based on Saka Raja calendar which was influenced by the Shaka era (78 CE) Indian Hindu calendar, with the current standard called Sakawi Cham likely instituted during the reign of Po Rome of the Champa kingdom.

Features
The Cham calendar has a system of a set of revolving cycles of days, weeks, months ad years. The Cham month consists of two lunar phases of 15 days each. The 1st half denotes the full moon phase called Bingun, while the new moon phase is called Kanam. The 12 year cycle similar to Chinese zodiac is referred to as Nâthak. The Cham calendar known as Sakawi Cham is a term used to encompass two calendar variants.
Sakawi Ahier: This is used by Balamon Hindu Chams and is lunisolar in nature.
Sakawi  Awal: This is used by Bani Muslim Chams and is lunar in nature.

The calendar is used as an agricultural almanac to ascertain the time of cultivation. The biggest Cham festival known as Kate festival falls on the 1st day of the seven Cham month.

Sakawi Ahier

System
The names of the days of the Cham week were derived from their Sanskrit names used in the traditional Hindu calendar.

The length of the month: the full month (balan tapăk) has 30 days and the hollow month (balan u) has 29 days.

 Balan Mak [Māgha]

Cham zodiac
The Cham zodiac is similar to the Vietnamese zodiac in its usage and arrangement of animals, but replaces the Monkey with the turtle (kra); the cat with the rabbit (Tapay).

Sakawi Awal
This variant is influenced by of 12 Arabic lunar months system consisting of 29-30 days. It uses an 8 year cycle called Ikessarak. This variant is used for certain Islamic festivals observed by the Bani Chams.

Festivals
Important festivals in the Cham calendar:
Rija Nukan- Cham New Year(Mar/Apr)
Katê- Harvest festival(Sep)

See also
Cham festival

References

Further reading
 Tran Ky Phuong, Bruce Lockhart, The Cham of Vietnam: History, Society and Art, NUS Press, Jan 1, 2011, p 326-328, accessed October 3, 2016 at https://books.google.com/books?id=GUHeBgAAQBAJ&pg=PA326
 ASIAN HIGHLANDS PERSPECTIVES 28: Collection of Papers p. 164

Cham
Obsolete calendars
Specific calendars